Kaghazkonan-e Shomali Rural District is in Kaghazkonan District of Mianeh County, East Azerbaijan province, Iran. At the National Census of 2006, its population was 3,818 in 1,212 households. There were 2,959 inhabitants in 1,147 households at the following census of 2011. At the most recent census of 2016, the population of the rural district was 3,216 in 1,226 households. The largest of its 34 villages was Qarah Bolagh, with 865 people.

References 

Meyaneh County

Rural Districts of East Azerbaijan Province

Populated places in East Azerbaijan Province

Populated places in Meyaneh County